Outbreakband is a Christian band from Germany. It was founded in 2007 as a result of Christian youth events at Glaubenszentrums Bad Gandersheim.  The band was named after Outbreak, a feature during the Christian youth events of the center.

Outbreakband plays at Teenstreet Kongress events, festivals, worship nights and international faith events.

In 2012, the band won the David Award for "2012 Best Artist". In 2013, Outbreakband won the pan-European Award of "Evangelical-oriented, modern Christian music scene" from the "German-speaking countries" category. Outbreakband 's live album Das ist unser Gott appeared on the German iTunes Albums Chart in July 2014.

Members
Main members usually include:

 Juri Friesen - vocals, acoustic guitar
 Mia Friesen - vocals
 Benni Schuhmacher - vocals
 Pala Friesen - guitar, vocals
 Stefan Schöpfle - synthesizer, loops
 Tobias Gamerdinger - keyboards
 Andy Polinski - guitar, vocals
 Elina Wildemann - vocals
 Markus Dinger - drums
 Niko Nilkens - bass

Discography

Albums

 2008: In deinem Licht
 2009: Alles Drin
 2010: Alles Drin Remix
 2011: Real Love
in collaboration with Glaubenszentrum Live
2010: Die Liebe des Retters (Special guest: Anja Lehmann)
2012: Gott und König (Special guest: Thomas Enns)
2014: Das ist unser Gott (Live album)

EPs
2014: Louder than Before

Singles
2013: "Frei sein Radio Edit" (from album Gott und König)
2014: "Frei sein Remix" (from album Gott und König)
2022: "Oase" (from album Jesus)

See also 
Andrew & Alaina Mack

References

External links
Official website

German musical groups